Kaldfjord is a village in Tromsø Municipality in Troms og Finnmark county, Norway. There are several villages located around Kaldfjord including Kjosen, Ersfjordbotn, and Kvaløysletta. Kaldfjord is considered part of the Kvaløysletta urban area.

References

Villages in Troms
Populated places of Arctic Norway
Tromsø